The 13413 / 13414 Farakka Express is an Express train of Indian Railways connecting Murshidabad and Malda districts of West Bengal with the national capital Delhi. This train is in much demand from the people of the district of Malda and Murshidabad. It covers a distance of 1422 km at an average speed of 42 km/h.

Halts 
This train halts at:-

Sahibganj
Kahalgaon

Coach composition
Coach composition of this train is as follows:
EOG-2, SL-9, GEN-7, 3AC-3, 2AC-1, PC-1; Total= 23 coaches

Schedule  

 13413 Farakka Express leaves  station at 19:10 on Monday, Thursday, Saturday and reaches  at 4:30 on second day.
 13414 Farakka Express departs Delhi Junction at 21:50 on Monday, Wednesday, Saturday and reaches Malda Town station 7:20 on second day. Pantry car and Tatkal scheme is available in this train.
It is hauled by WAP-4/WAP-5 locomotive from Old Delhi to  Malda Town

References

External links 
 Farakka Express/13413 India Rail Info
 Farakka Express/13414 India Rail Info

Transport in Maldah
Transport in Delhi
Named passenger trains of India
Rail transport in West Bengal
Rail transport in Uttar Pradesh
Rail transport in Bihar
Rail transport in Jharkhand
Rail transport in Delhi
Express trains in India